Eurypatagidae is a family of echinoderms belonging to the order Spatangoida.

Genera:
 Elipneustes Koehler, 1914
 Eurypatagus Mortensen, 1948
 Linopneustes A.Agassiz, 1881
 Paramaretia Mortensen, 1950
 Platybrissus Grube, 1866

References

Spatangoida
Echinoderm families